Lyndon Ambrose Smith (July 15, 1854March 5, 1918) was an American educator, lawyer and Republican politician who served as the 14th Attorney General and the 15th Lieutenant Governor of Minnesota.

Life and career
Smith was born in Boscawen, New Hampshire in 1854. His father Ambrose Smith was a clergyman and congregational pastor; his mother Cynthia Egerton was a descendant of Mayflower passenger and Plymouth colony governor William Bradford. Smith attended Dartmouth College and served as the superintendent of schools in Norwich, Vermont while in school. He graduated as valedictorian in 1880. He later worked with the National Commissioner of Education and as the superintendent of the World Cotton Centennial's educational department. He also earned a law degree at Georgetown University Law Center.

In 1885 Smith moved to Minnesota, settling in Montevideo, Minnesota and establishing a law practice. In 1886, he married Dora Rogers, a teacher originally from Maine. Together they had a daughter Charlotte (b. 1888).

Smith's political career began in 1889 when he was elected attorney for Chippewa County, Minnesota. He served only one term but was later elected Lieutenant Governor under Republican John Lind in 1899 and re-elected under his successor Samuel Van Sant in 1901. He returned to the position of Chippewa County attorney from 1903 to 1909 when he was appointed as assistant state Attorney General. Smith later ran for the office of Attorney General as a Republican, winning his first term in 1912 and re-election in 1914 and 1916.

Smith died while in office on March 5, 1918. He is buried in Orchard Grove Cemetery in Kittery, Maine.

Electoral history
1912 Race for Attorney General (Republican Primary)
Lyndon A. Smith 84,816 
Thomas Fraser 56,137
1912 Race for Attorney General (General Election)
Lyndon A. Smith (Republican) 166,950
William F. Donohue (Democrat) 83,997
J. H. Morse (Prohibition) 27,140
1914 Race for Attorney General (Republican Primary)
Lyndon A. Smith 104,653
James Manahan 76,110
1914 Race for Attorney General (General Election)
Lyndon A. Smith (Republican) 195,372
Neil M. Cronin (Democrat) 94,025
August V. Rieke (Progressive) 16,736
1916 Race for Attorney General (General Election)
Lyndon A. Smith (Republican) 263,285 (unopposed)

References

1854 births
1918 deaths
People from Montevideo, Minnesota
Lieutenant Governors of Minnesota
Minnesota Attorneys General
Minnesota Republicans
People from Boscawen, New Hampshire
Dartmouth College alumni
Georgetown University Law Center alumni
19th-century American politicians